Kentro Neotitas Maroniton was a Cypriot football club based in Limassol (1977-1983) and then in Nicosia. The team was playing sometimes in Second and sometimes in the Third and Fourth Division.

Honours
 Cypriot Third Division:
 Champions (1): 1981
 Cypriot Fourth Division:
 Champions (1): 1991

References

Defunct football clubs in Cyprus